Asamoah Gyan is a Ghanaian professional footballer who has represented the Ghana national football team as a forward since 2003. He made his debut appearance for Ghana on 16 November 2003, during a friendly against Somalia; at age of 17, three days before his 18th birthday. He scored on his debut in the 81st minute after coming on in the 77th minute for Nana Arhin Duah. He scored his 13th goal in a friendly match against Senegal on 21 August 2007. As of April 2021, he is the country's all-time top goalscorer with 51 goals in 109 appearances.

International goals 
Scores and results list Ghana's goal tally first.

Statistics

References

External links 

 Asamoah Gyan at RSSSF
 Asamoah Gyan at NFT

Gyan, Asamoah
Ghana national football team